Lynne Ann Cheney (born August 14, 1941) is an American author, scholar, and former talk show host. She is married to the 46th vice president of the United States, Dick Cheney, and served as the second lady of the United States from 2001 to 2009.

Childhood and education
Lynne Ann Vincent was born on August 14, 1941, in Casper, Wyoming. Her mother, Edna Lolita (née Lybyer, 1919–1973), became a deputy sheriff, and her father, Wayne Edwin Vincent, was an engineer. A descendant of Mormon pioneers, and with roots in Denmark, Sweden, England, Ireland, and Wales, she was raised Presbyterian and became Methodist upon her marriage to Dick Cheney.

Cheney received her Bachelor of Arts degree in English literature with highest honors from Colorado College. She continued her education with a Master of Arts degree from the University of Colorado in Boulder, and a PhD in 19th-century British literature from the University of Wisconsin–Madison. Her dissertation was entitled "Matthew Arnold's Possible Perfection: A Study of the Kantian Strain in Arnold's Poetry".

Early career
Cheney served as the sixth chair of the National Endowment for the Humanities (NEH) from 1986 to 1993. In 1995, she founded the American Council of Trustees and Alumni, a think tank devoted to reforming higher education.

She is a senior fellow in education and culture at the American Enterprise Institute for Public Policy Research. She also serves as a director of Reader's Digest Association, Inc. From 1995 to 1998, Cheney served as the co-host of the Sunday edition of CNN's Crossfire, replacing Tony Snow.

Cheney served on Lockheed Corporation's board of directors from 1994 to 2001. She gave up the $120,000-a-year position shortly before her husband's inauguration. She had served on the Lockheed board's finance, and nominating and corporate governance committees.

In 2000, she was mentioned as a possible conservative female pick for Republican vice presidential nominee on the George W. Bush ticket. The appointed head of the nominating committee was her husband, Dick Cheney, then the CEO of Halliburton, who eventually emerged as Bush's choice.

National history standards
In the early 1990s when heading the NEH, Cheney advocated voluntary national history standards for the nation's high school students and announced plans to create them. In 1994 shortly before the standards were to be released, Cheney, who was aghast at the results, wrote an opinion for The Wall Street Journal she titled The End of History, where she "set off a firestorm," according to Gary B. Nash who headed the standards effort. Cheney followed with another opinion, The End of History, Part II in 2015. As of the early 2020s, her reversal is still cited in the discussion and controversy surrounding The 1619 Project.

Later career
As second lady, she repeatedly spoke out against violent and sexually explicit lyrics in popular music, including those of rapper Eminem, picking up on an issue that was originally made famous by former vice president Al Gore and his wife Tipper. She also criticized video game developers for similar content.

On an October 10, 2007, episode of The Daily Show, Cheney stated her opposition to a constitutional amendment banning same-sex marriage. Her daughter Mary identifies as lesbian and both Lynne Cheney and her husband Dick have publicly supported same-sex marriage during and after his vice presidency.

Family
Lynne Cheney married Richard Cheney in 1964. They have two daughters and seven grandchildren. Their daughters are Elizabeth Cheney (born July 28, 1966), and Mary Cheney (born on March 14, 1969).

Lynne Cheney has one brother, Mark Vincent, who lives in Wyoming with his wife, Linda.

Wyoming U.S. Senate seat vacancy
Cheney was considered a possible contender to complete the term of Craig L. Thomas as U.S. senator from Wyoming following his death in 2007. A spokesman stated that she was considering the post but she never signed an application to become a candidate. Cheney herself acknowledged in a 2015 interview that she had considered running for the senate seat. If she had won the seat, she would have become the first former second lady to be a member of the Senate since Muriel Humphrey was appointed Senator from Minnesota after her husband's death in 1978.

In popular culture 
Cheney criticized Eminem in September 2000 for his promotion of "violence of the most degrading kind against women", in response to which he mockingly referenced Lynne and Dick Cheney (and his recurring heart problems) in the 2002 song "Without Me". Cheney was portrayed by Amy Adams in the 2018 film Vice, a biopic about Dick Cheney. In this political satire, she is portrayed as a sly driving force and a source of inspiration and support behind her husband's political career.

Books

Lynne Cheney is the author or co-author of several books.

Fiction
 Executive Privilege: A Washington Novel (1979)
 Sisters (1981). New American Library (now part of Penguin Random House).
 The Body Politic: A Novel (2000), co-authored with Victor Gold

Non-Fiction
 Kings of the Hill: Power and Personality in the House of Representatives (1983), co-authored with her husband and future vice-president of the United States, Richard M. "Dick" Cheney. New York City: Continuum.
 American Memory: A Report on the Humanities in the Nation's Public Schools (1987)
 Academic Freedom (1992)
 Telling the Truth: Why Our Country and Our Culture Have Stopped Making Sense—and What We Can Do About It (1995)
 Kings of the Hill: How Nine Powerful Men Changed the Course of American History (1996), co-authored with Dick Cheney. Revised edition of Kings of the Hill published in 1983 by Continuum. The major difference is an added chapter on Speaker of the House Newt Gingrich. New York City: Touchstone/Simon & Schuster
 America: A Patriotic Primer (2002)
 A is for Abigail: An Almanac of Amazing American Women (2003)
 When Washington Crossed the Delaware: A Wintertime Story for Young Patriots (2004)
 A Time for Freedom: What Happened When in America (2005)
 Our 50 States: A Family Adventure Across America (2006)
 Blue Skies, No Fences: A Memoir of Childhood and Family (2007)
 We the People: The Story of Our Constitution (2008)
 James Madison: A Life Reconsidered (2014)
 The Virginia Dynasty: Four Presidents and the Creation of the American Nation (2020)

References

Additional sources
 Joe Mandak. "Lynn Cheney Upset With Kerry Over Remark" Associated Press. October 14, 2004.
 Ian Bishop and Deborah Orin. "Veep to Kerry: How Dare You! – 'Angry Dad' Hits Foe for Naming Gay Daughter" New York Post. October 15, 2004.

External links

 White House's Lynne Cheney Page archived
 
 See 10 Questions for Lynne Cheney, TIME (September 20, 2007)
 

|-

|-

1941 births
20th-century American novelists
21st-century American writers
20th-century American women writers
21st-century American women writers
American Enterprise Institute
American people of Danish descent
American people of English descent
American people of Irish descent
American people of Welsh descent
American people of Swedish descent
American television talk show hosts
American women novelists
American Presbyterians
Chairpersons of the National Endowment for the Humanities
Lynne
Colorado College alumni
Converts to Methodism
Former Presbyterians
Living people
People from Casper, Wyoming
People from Jackson, Wyoming
Second ladies of the United States
University of Colorado Boulder alumni
University of Wisconsin–Madison alumni
Writers from Wyoming
Wyoming Republicans
American United Methodists
Lockheed Martin people